Margaretha Ziesenis was a German portrait painter and miniaturist. She was a daughter of the painter Johann Georg Ziesenis and sister of the painter Maria Elisabeth Ziesenis. Besides portraits, she also produced copies in miniature of the works of other painters.

References

18th-century German painters
18th-century German women artists
German women painters
German portrait painters
Portrait miniaturists
Sibling artists